Fred A. Reed (born 1939) is a journalist, author and translator born in the United States who has published and translated several books. He is a three-time winner of the Governor General's Award for French to English translation, for his translations of works by Thierry Hentsch and Martine Desjardins, and received six further shortlisted nominations.

Books
Persian postcards: Iran after Khomemi. Talonbooks. 1994. 
Salonica terminus:Travels into the Balkan Nightmare Talonbooks, 1996. 
Anatolia junction: A journey into hidden Turkey.  Talonbooks.  1999. 
Massoumeh Ebtekar and Fred A. Reed Takeover in Tehran: the inside story of the 1979 U.S. Embassy capture  Talonbooks.  2000. 
Shattered images: the rise of militant iconoclasm in Syria.  Talonbooks.  2003. 
 Jean-Daniel Lafond, and Fred A. Reed Conversations in Tehran Talonbooks, 2006.

Translations
 Martine Desjardins, translated from French by Fred A. Reed and David Homel Fairy Ring  Talonbooks.  2001
 Martine Desjardins, translated from French by Fred A. Reed and David Homel All that glitters.  Talonbooks.  2005.
 Paulos Matesis, translated from Greek by Fred A. Reed. The Daughter: a novel Arcadia Books.  2002.

References

External links

1939 births
Canadian translators
Living people
Governor General's Award-winning translators